Night Leaves is an album by pianist Jaki Byard and cellist David Eyges.

Recording and music
Eyges plays his composition "Reflections" arco. "Gimme Some/Cinco Quatro Boogie Woogie" is played in 5/4 time.

Reception

The JazzTimes reviewer concluded that "This recording proves once again that cello and piano can make for a most agreeable duo." The AllMusic reviewer stated that "There's a beautiful sense of harmonic understanding and freedom, a sense of timing beyond structured rhythms, and an empathy that these two retain simply by listening closely to one another."

Track listing
"Night Leaves" – 1:29 	
"Gimme Some/Cinco Quatro Boogie Woogie" – 2:19 	
"The Chase" – 3:27 	
"Reflections" – 3:54 	
"Why It Is" – 5:05 	
"Waltz for Louise" – 4:09 	
"Epietis, Phaedrus, Terence, Metis" – 5:46 	
"Louise/One Note to My Wife" – 4:38 	
"Toni" – 4:10 	
"Broken Circle" – 3:14 	
"To Our Family" – 4:12

Personnel
 Jaki Byard – piano
 David Eyges – electric cello

References

Jaki Byard albums
1997 albums